The Purus River (Portuguese: Rio Purus; Spanish: Río Purús) is a tributary of the Amazon River in South America. The river shares its name with the Alto Purús National Park and the Purús Province (and its conformed Purús District), one of the four provinces of Peru in the Ucayali Region.

Geography 

The Purus River rises in Peru.
It defines the boundary between Peru and Brazil in the centre of the state of Acre, then runs for a short distance along the boundary of the  Santa Rosa do Purus National Forest, a sustainable use conservation unit created in 2001 after it is joined by the Santa Rosa River.
It then flows north east through Manoel Urbano
It runs through a continuous forest at the bottom of the great depression, lying between the Madeira River, which skirts the edge of the Brazilian sandstone plateau, and the Ucayali River, which hugs the base of the Andes.

In the state of Amazonas the river runs through the  Arapixi Extractive Reserve, created in 2006 and past the town of Boca do Acre at the end of the BR-317 highway.
Further down, it forms the west boundary of the  Purus National Forest, created in 1988.
From the town of Pauini down to the town of Lábrea the river is bordered by the   Médio Purus Extractive Reserve, created in 2008.
Below this it runs through the  Canutama Extractive Reserve along the stretch between the towns of Lábrea and Canutama.
In the lowest reaches the river flows through the  Piagaçu-Purus Sustainable Development Reserve, established in 2003, which holds a large part of its floodplain.
It enters the Amazon River west of the Madeira River, which it parallels as far south as the falls of the latter stream.

William Chandless found its elevation above sea level to be only   from its mouth. It is one of the most crooked streams in the world, and its length in a straight line is less than half of its length following its curves. It is practically only a drainage ditch for the half-submerged, lake-flooded district it crosses.

Biodiversity 
The Purús red howler (Alouatta puruensis) is a species of howler monkey native to Brazil, Peru and north of Bolivia.
Peckoltia brevis, a kind of catfish, is found in the middle and upper Amazon within the Purus river basin.

Most of the central and lower sections of the river flow through the Purus várzea ecoregion.
In the municipality of Tapauá, Amazonas, the river flows through the  Abufari Biological Reserve, a strictly protected area.

Earthworks discovery 

In 2008, a previously unknown pre-Columbian civilization was discovered in the upper region of the river close to the Bolivian border. After much of the forest in the region was cleared for agricultural use, satellite pictures revealed the remains of large geometric earthworks.

See also
 Amazon rainforest
 Esperanza, Ucayali
 Brazilian Amazon
 Peruvian Amazon
 River basin
 Catauxi

References

 Purus River. (2010). In Encyclopædia Britannica. Retrieved January 12, 2010, from Encyclopædia Britannica Online.

External links
 Map of Amazon State with Purus River, Brazilian Ministry of Transport
 
 

Tributaries of the Amazon River
Rivers of Acre (state)
Rivers of Amazonas (Brazilian state)
Rivers of Peru
International rivers of South America
Brazil–Peru border
Rivers of Ucayali Region
Border rivers